Ginosa is a small town and comune in the province of Taranto, Apulia, southern Italy.

Main sights
The most important monument of Ginosa is the Castello Normanno (Norman Castle). It was built in 1080 by Robert Guiscard to defend the city from the invasions of Saracen troops. 
Originally the castle was adorned by three towers and a drawbridge, all destroyed during the 16th century, when the town became a barony of the Doria family. The castle subsequently became a residential palace and also today overlooks the most ancient area of the town.
The castle is also part of the commune's coat of arms.

The Chiesa Madre (mother church) was built in 1554 and is dedicated to Saint Martin of Tours, one of the most popular saints in France. It is a typical southern Italian Baroque style church.

Structures
Near Ginosa, there is a  water tower, nicknamed "Il Missile".

Climate
Marina di Ginosa has a hot-summer mediterranean climate (Köppen Csa). Being in the interior of a bay, the location receives inland heatwaves more frequently than most mediterranean coastlines. This leads to unusually warm coastal days in summer by mainland Italian standards. Rainfall is infrequent, but heavy enough when it arrives to ensure about  annually. The municipal seat is likely even hotter in summer due to the relative distance from the coastline.

See also
 Marina di Ginosa

References

External links

Official website

Cities and towns in Apulia